Burning Words is a 1923 American silent Western film directed by Stuart Paton and starring Roy Stewart,  Laura La Plante, and Harold Goodwin.

Cast
 Roy Stewart asDavid Darby
 Laura La Plante as Mary Malcolm
 Harold Goodwin as Ross Darby
 Edith Yorke as Mother Darby
 Alfred Fisher as Father Darby
 William Welsh as John Malcolm
 Noble Johnson as Bad Pierre
 Eve Southern as Nan Bishp
 Harry Carter as Slip Martin
 George A. McDaniel as Mounted-Police Sergeant Chase

References

Bibliography
 Connelly, Robert B. The Silents: Silent Feature Films, 1910-36, Volume 40, Issue 2. December Press, 1998.
 Munden, Kenneth White. The American Film Institute Catalog of Motion Pictures Produced in the United States, Part 1. University of California Press, 1997.

External links
 

1923 films
1923 Western (genre) films
1920s English-language films
American silent feature films
Silent American Western (genre) films
Films directed by Stuart Paton
American black-and-white films
Universal Pictures films
1920s American films